George Horsburgh (27 October 1910 – 10 March 1986) was a Scotland international rugby union player. He played as a Lock.

Rugby Union career

Amateur career

He first played for Stirling HSFP before moving to London.

He played for London Scottish.

Provincial career

He was supposed to play for the Scotland Probables in the first trial match of season 1937-38. The match due on 18 December 1937 was called off due to frost despite the contingency of straw being placed on The Greenyards pitch at Melrose. When the second trial match went ahead in January 1938 as planned Horsburgh started for the Probables side. However, in the second half of the match Horsbugh played for Scotland Possibles.

International career

Horsburgh was capped by Scotland 9 times, all in the period between 1937 and 1939.

Administrative career

After his playing career ended, he joined the board committee of London Scottish.

Military career

Horsburgh joined the Army.

References

1910 births
1986 deaths
Rugby union players from Stirling
Scottish rugby union players
Scotland international rugby union players
London Scottish F.C. players
Scotland Probables players
Scotland Possibles players
Stirling HSFP players
Rugby union locks